Dalgan Rural District is a rural district (dehestan) in the Central District of Dalgan County, Sistan and Baluchestan province, Iran. At the 2006 census, its population was 23,068, in 4,263 families.  The rural district has 59 villages.

References 

Rural Districts of Sistan and Baluchestan Province
Dalgan County